The 1967 Thomas Cup was the seventh tournament of Thomas Cup, the most important men's badminton team competition in the world. The inter-zone matches and Challenge Round finale were held in Jakarta, Indonesia.

Malaysia won its fourth title after beating Indonesia in the Challenge Round under unusual circumstances. With Malaysia leading Indonesia 4 matches to 3 in the best of nine series, play was suspended during the eighth match due to unruly crowd behavior (see Challenge round below).

This contest was noteworthy for other reasons as well: the old met the new.  Indonesia's  Rudy Hartono, not yet 18, burst onto the scene as did other new stars such as Denmark's Svend Andersen (Pri) and Japan's Ippei Kojima. It was the last Thomas Cup, and a sad exit, for  Hartono's teammate Ferry Sonneville who was more than twice Hartono's age. It was also the last time Erland Kops played in the inter-zone matches and the last inter-zone appearance for other veterans such as Malaysia's Teh Kew San and the USA's Jim Poole.

Intra-zone summary
The competition initially involved 23 nations, though two of these, East Germany and Thailand (a major men's badminton power at that time) declined to play their opening ties (sets of matches). The draw was made up of four zones; Asian, European, American, and Australasian; with the winners of each zone then competing for the right to play defending champion Indonesia in the Challenge Round.

A powerful Malaysian team coasted through the Asian zone by beating India and then Pakistan, each with the loss of one match (8-1). The European zone provided the largest number of closely fought ties. In one zone semifinal Sweden nearly upset perennial zone winner Denmark, losing the last two matches to go down 4 matches to 5. South Africa upset England 6 to 3 in the other semifinal, but was no match for Denmark (1-8) in the final. In the final of the American zone the USA narrowly defeated Canada 5 to 4. Japan easily defeated New Zealand (9-0) and Australia (9-0) in the Australasian zone to reserve its place in the inter-zone competition.

Teams
5 teams from 4 regions took part in the Inter-Zone ties. As defending champion, Indonesia skipped the Final Round and played directly in the Challenge Round.

Australasian Zone

Asian Zone

European Zone

Pan-American Zone

Inter-zone playoffs
The first inter-zone tie in Jakarta pitted Denmark against Malaysia. "On paper" they were the two strongest teams in the tournament with recent major event champions such as Erland Kops, Henning Borch, and Svend Andersen (Pri) for Denmark, and Tan Aik Huang, Ng Boon Bee, and Tan Yee Khan for Malaysia. With wins by Kops in singles and Andersen and Per Walsøe in doubles, Denmark was able to stay even (2–2) on the first night of play. On the second night, however, a familiar pattern recurred for the tropically-challenged Danes as they wilted in the heat to drop all five matches. In the other semifinal Japan's tiny but "jet-propelled" Ippei Kojima won all four of his matches to trump a crowd-pleasing performance by 35-year-old Jim Poole and lead his team to a 7–2 victory over the USA.

The inter-zone final between Malaysia and Japan was less suspenseful than the 6–3 final score might indicate. Though two of the first five matches were very close Malaysia won all five to clinch the contest early. The powerful doubles team of Boon Bee and Yee Khan remained undefeated in the series while Masao Akiyama performed well in defeat for Japan

First round

Final round

Challenge round
The most unusual finale in Thomas Cup history, the challenge round of the 1967 competition was full of firsts and lasts. It was the last actual challenge round since a subsequent rules change would end the defending champion's privilege of having only to defend the Cup against a single challenger. Politically, it was first Thomas Cup finale in which the former Malaya (minus Singapore but with additional territories) competed as Malaysia, and the first finale in which domestic turmoil caused Indonesian players of Chinese ethnicity to take "Indonesian" names. Thus veteran doubles player Tan King Gwan became Darmawan Supatera and Ang Tjin Siang became Muljadi. It was the first Thomas Cup appearance of Indonesia's badminton wunderkind Rudy Hartono (two months before his eighteenth birthday). It was the last appearance for Indonesia's past Thomas Cup hero Ferry Sonneville. For reasons unclear, he was pressed into service in one of the top two singles slots ahead of younger men who were by then almost certainly stronger players than the 36-year-old Sonneville. Most notably, it was the first and thus far the last final tie of Thomas Cup not to determine a champion on the court.

The first day's play ended with a 3–1 advantage to Malaysia. With relentless attacking play Hartono stunned Tan Aik Huang 15-6, 15-8, but Malaysia won both doubles matches and the singles between Yew Cheng Hoe and Sonneville. On the second night Tan Aik Huang routed Sonneville to bring Malaysia to the verge of victory. At this point, however, young Hartono comfortably beat Yew Cheng Hoe to keep Indonesia's chances alive. Then Muljadi pulled away in the second game after winning a close first to beat Malaysian veteran Teh Kew San at third singles. Still up 4–3, Malaysia sent the world's number one doubles team of Ng Boon Bee and Tan Yee Khan onto the court to gain the vital fifth point. They seemed to be doing so easily until, up 10-2 in the second after steamrolling Muljadi and Agus Susanto in the first game, a few errors crept into their play. This encouraged ebullient Indonesian fans to try to promote a Malaysian collapse by making deafening noise on Malaysian serves, using flash photography at well timed moments, and ever more loudly cheering Malaysian errors. With no help from Indonesian authorities, IBF (BWF) officials intermittently appealed for "fair play" but in vain because the crowd's tactics were working. Plainly rattled, Boon Bee and Yee Khan let a 10-2 lead slip away into a 13-18 second game loss. 

At this juncture, during what would normally have been a five-minute break between games, tournament referee Herbert Scheele requested Indonesian authorities to clear the stadium and have the match continued with the crowd locked out. When this request was refused Scheele, at some personal risk, halted play. Eventually, a less than candid announcement that the match had been voluntarily suspended did help to clear the stadium, but play was never continued. Indonesia rejected a subsequent IBF (BWF) ruling that the tie be resumed in New Zealand. Thereby, it forfeited the remaining matches. Officially, if not convincingly, by a 6–3 margin Malaysia regained the Thomas Cup.

 Play suspended and match eventually conceded to Malaysia

References

External links
Smash: 1966-67 Thomas Cup - Challenge Round
Mike's Badminton Populorum 

Thomas Cup
Thomas Cup
Thomas & Uber Cup